A Schützenfest (marksmen's festival) is a traditional festival or fair featuring a target shooting competition in the cultures of Germany, the Netherlands and Switzerland.

At a Schützenfest, contestants compete based on their shooting abilities, for example, by shooting at a wooden representation of an eagle. The competition's winner becomes the Schützenkönig ("king of marksmen") until the following year's competition.

The commercially-organized Hanover Schützenfest, Germany, is the largest marksmen's funfair in the world with more than 7,000 marksmen, 250 rides and inns, five large beer tents, and the "Marksmen's Parade". It is the longest parade in the world. The landmark of the funfair is one of the highest transportable big wheels (US = Ferris wheels) in the world.

History 

Schützenvereine (associations of marksmen) und Schützenfeste (their festivals) belong to communal life in the Germanic regions of Europe. Their tradition dates back for centuries and has continued to the present day.

The word Schütze means marksman and protector, as contained in "to shield", e.g., a Schutzmann is a German policeman. The pride of strong-armed self-defense underlies the popularity of Schützenvereine comparable to the popularity of volunteer fire brigades, particularly in smaller towns or villages.

The main event of a Schützenfest is the shooting competition to determine the marksmen's king (Schützenkönig) of the following year. The traditional trophy for the winner is an Ehrenscheibe or Königsscheibe, a painted target disk. In rural districts, one finds gables of houses decorated with them.

In Switzerland, the first national Swiss Federal Shooting Festival (Eidgenössisches Schützenfest) was held in 1824, but the local festivals also date back centuries earlier. Shooting medals and shooting cups seem to be the common forms of Swiss awards. Swiss shooting medals were struck in a variety of metals including gold, silver, bronze, white metal, and aluminum, with silver being the most common. Mintages are very low, with the average mintage of the  silver being 700-800 pieces. The scarcity of medals has increased over the years due to the awards being melted for bullion, being lost, and general attrition.
Shooting thalers are coins minted to commemorate shooting festivals.
Swiss shooting thalers began mintage in 1842, with the Eidgenössisches Schützenfest in Chur, still under the cantonal authority of Graubünden.  Shooting thalers between 1855 and 1934 were minted under federal authority, and were legal tender (with a nominal value of 5 francs). 
Shooting thalers continue to be minted today, but since 1939 are no longer legal tender.

During the Middle Ages, many towns had to find ways to defend themselves from gangs of marauders. For this reason, clubs and associations were founded, comparable to militias; these paramilitary associations were sanctioned for the first time in the Law for the Defensive Constitution of the Towns by King Henry I, and officially integrated into the towns' defense plans. Accompanying the military exercises and physical examinations of the towns' contingents, festivities were combined with festive processions. Participants from other parishes and, at times, even the feudal heads of state were also invited to these Marksmen's Courts (Schützenhöfe). However, the self-confident spirit of the townsfolk that marked these festivities was not always regarded positively by the authorities.
For this reason, different traditions developed in other regions. The military significance lessened over the centuries and became meaningless with the creation of regular troops and garrisons for national defense. The Schützenfests, however, continued in the form of a regional patriotic tradition.

Germany

Schützenfests are celebrated mainly in Bavaria and Lower Saxony, but also in the Lower Rhine and Middle Rhine regions as well as in Westphalia (especially the Sauerland), with festive processions. Since German Reunification, Schützenfests have also begun to emerge in eastern parts of Germany.  The traditions connected to the Schützenfest vary significantly from one region to another in Germany.

These traditions include the "Blow of the Flag" (a particular way of waving a flag). The Blow of the Flag in particular, and the waving of the flag in general, are executed according to fixed rules. Competitions are held in the discipline of flag-waving.

Schützenfests may range from one day to several days and may include and be accompanied by various events. They often occur in the festival room of a local public house or in a pavilion especially erected for the occasion. In the Sauerland, many towns have a special Marksmen's Hall that is used for these festivities. Many Schützenfests start with a festive procession, whereby the reigning King of Marksmen, the royal household, and local dignitaries are all escorted by the marksmen and paraded to the festive square or the festivities. This is often followed by a "royal parade" where the marksmen march past the king and the royal court, with marching bands, Corps of Drums, and fanfare bands playing along. The parading marksmen are formed in platoons or squads depending on the size of the formation, and in large towns and cities, marksmen are formed in companies and in both cases of the parade color guards march along with them. In a lot of cases, the pavilion is surrounded by a funfair.

The most common form of shooting competition is the Bird Shooting. The contestants no longer shoot at actual birds but on a mock bird made of wood and mounted on a pole. The contestant who demounts the last pieces of the wooden bird is the new King of Marksmen. Varying traditions may include shooting wooden animals other than birds or special awards won by hitting certain body parts, e.g., wings, beak, etc.

Even a Großer Zapfenstreich and band concerts form part of the celebrations as well. The Großer Zapfenstreich done in these civil events, even though the military in origin as the festival itself, comprises the marksmen's organizations, torch-bearers, color guards, and a marching band and corps of drums, with an optional fanfare band when needed. Most are done outdoors, and there's an option to have an indoor ceremony done in the same manner as the outdoor ceremony. Many of the groups that help organize these festivities celebrate German pride, local community and state traditions, weapon drills (sans bayonets), and the wearing of local military uniforms.  The use of the military hand salute is observed in many of these events. Typically the Bundeswehr marching practice is followed. Some have modern-styled marching bands, or bands modeled on foreign militaries, and march along during the parades with different variants per region.  In Neuss, for example, the Rhine Guards Drum and Bugle Corps (based on the bands of the United States Marine Corps), and the Quirinus Band and Bugle Corps (under its current Bandmaster Peter Hosking - Ex Light Division), Germany's 1st ever band and bugles in the traditions of the British Army Light Division regiments (now The Rifles), that were based in West Germany during the Cold War years, have been a part of the parades there in recent years.  A re-formed band, the Kapellen-Efrt Band of the Grenadier Guards, perpetuates the traditions of the Foot Guards regiments of the British Household Division, which were deployed during the Cold War in Lower Saxony. A few corps only make use of the US-style hand-over-heart civil salute during the Großer Zapfenstreich to distinguish these associations from the Bundeswehr, which uses the military hand salute.

Notable German Schützenfests include
 Deutsches Bundesschießen: Organised by the German Shooting and Archery Federation, the first German Rifle Meeting was 1862 in Frankfurt am Main. So far, the last one was 2011 in Gotha.
 The Hanover Schützenfest: The largest Schützenfest in the world, including rifle platoons from all over Germany and the world
 The Neuss Schützenfest: The largest Schützenfest in the world that is organized by a single association and does not include platoons from other cities

Switzerland

Schützenfeste played a central role in the Old Swiss Confederacy, during the 15th century, participants shooting the crossbow, contributing significantly to the coherence between the individual cantons.

Eidgenössische Schützenfeste were organized by the Schweizerischer Schützenverein in the Restored Confederacy, for the first time in 1824.
The first federal Schützenfest after the formation of the federal state, again held in Aarau, in 1849, figures prominently in Gottfried Kellers Das Fähnlein der Sieben Aufrechten, where Keller portrays the shooting clubs as vital for the preservation of direct democracy in the young Swiss federal state.

Further festivals were held between 1859 and 1939 at irregular intervals of 2 to 4 years, and between 1949 and 1977, at intervals of 3 to 6 years.
From 1985, the Eidgenössisches Schützenfest was held regularly every five years.
The 2020 event, postponed to 2021 due to the COVID-19 pandemic in Switzerland, is scheduled to be held from 11 June to 11 July 2021 in Luzern.

Countless cantonal and regional Schützenfeste take place in Switzerland every year.

Overseas
Schützenfeste organized by German or Swiss expatriate communities overseas:

Australia
Adelaide Schützenfest,  run by the South Australian German Association in Brooklyn Park, South Australia

Brazil
 Jaraguá do Sul, Santa Catarina

Canada
 Rural Municipality of St. Andrews, Manitoba

Namibia
 The small southern town of Keetmanshoop had a Schützenhaus (marksmen's club house) as one of its first buildings, in 1905-07)

United States

 Altamont, Illinois
 Anaheim, California
 Artemas, Pennsylvania
 Auburn Hills, Michigan
 Bow Valley, Nebraska
 Cincinnati, Ohio
 Deshler, Ohio
 Ehrhardt, South Carolina
 Fredericksburg, Texas
 Grapetown, Texas
 Las Vegas, Nevada
 New Glarus, Wisconsin
 Phoenix, Arizona
 Raton, New Mexico (Annual International Schützenfest)

References

External links

 Video showing many aspects of a Schützenfest
 2010 Aarau
 Newspaper article talking about Deshler, Ohio's annual Schützenfest

Shooting competitions
Shooting competitions in Germany
Shooting competitions in Switzerland
Festivals in Switzerland
Festivals in Germany